Daramdin Assembly constituency is one of the 32 assembly constituencies of Sikkim a north east state of India. Daramdin is part of Sikkim Lok Sabha constituency.

Members of Legislative Assembly
 1979: Padam Bahadur Gurung, Sikkim Janata Parishad
 1985: Padam Bahadur Gurung, Sikkim Sangram Parishad
 1989: Padam Bahadur Gurung, Sikkim Sangram Parishad
 1994: Ran Bahadur Subba, Sikkim Democratic Front
 1999: Ran Bahadur Subba, Sikkim Democratic Front
 2004: Ran Bahadur Subba, Sikkim Democratic Front
 2009: Tenzi Sherpa, Sikkim Democratic Front
 2014: Danorbu Sherpa, Sikkim Democratic Front

Election results

2019

See also

 Daramdin
 West Sikkim district
 List of constituencies of Sikkim Legislative Assembly

References

Assembly constituencies of Sikkim
Gyalshing district